The Women's individual table tennis – Class 1-2 tournament at the 2020 Summer Paralympics in Tokyo is taking place between 25 and 29 August 2021 at Tokyo Metropolitan Gymnasium. Classes 1–5 are for athletes with a physical impairment that affected their legs, and who compete in a sitting position. The lower the number, the greater the impact the impairment is on an athlete's ability to compete.

In the preliminary stage, athletes competed in seven groups of three. Winners and runners-up of each group qualified for the knock-out stage. In this edition of the Games, no bronze medal match will be held. Losers of each semifinal will automatically be awarded a bronze medal.

Results 
All times are local time in UTC+9.

Preliminary round 
The first two matches were played on 25 August, and the third on 26 August.

Group A

Group B

Group C

Group D

Final Rounds

References 

Women's Singles - Classes 1-2 Draw. Tokyo Paralympics Women's Singles - Classes 1-2 Draw.
Women's Singles - Classes 1-2 Player Statistics. Tokyo Paralympics Women's Singles - Classes 1-2 Player Statistics.
Women's Singles - Classes 1-2 Tournament Statistics. Tokyo Paralympics Women's Singles - Classes 1-2 Tournament Statistics.
Women's Singles - Classes 1-2 Medalist. Tokyo Paralympics Women's Singles - Classes 1-2 Medalist.

Women's individual - Class 1-2